Johann von Blatten, O.F.M. (died 1461) was a Roman Catholic prelate who served as Auxiliary Bishop of Konstanz (1441–1461).

Biography
Johann von Blatten was ordained a priest in the Order of Friars Minor. On 30 Jan 1441, he was appointed during the papacy of Pope Eugene IV as Auxiliary Bishop of Konstanz and Titular Bishop of Belline. He served as  Auxiliary Bishop of Konstanz until his resignation on 4 Jan 1461. He died in Dec 1461. While bishop, he was the principal co-consecrator of Arnold von Rotperg, Bishop of Basel (1451).

See also 
Catholic Church in Germany

References 

15th-century German Roman Catholic bishops
Bishops appointed by Pope Eugene IV
1461 deaths
Franciscan bishops